The East Mississippi State Hospital (EMSH) is a mental health facility of the Mississippi Department of Mental Health located in Meridian, Mississippi. The facility is the third-largest employer in the Meridian area.

A regional center, EMSH serves 31 counties, including Alcorn,  Covington,  Choctaw,  Clarke,  Clay,  Forrest,  George, Greene, Jackson, Jasper, Jefferson Davis, Jones, Kemper, Lamar, Lauderdale County, Leake, Lowndes, Marion, Neshoba, Newton, Noxubee, Oktibbeha, Perry, Prentiss, Scott, Smith, Tippah, Tishomingo, Wayne, Webster, and Winston.

History
Due to advocacy from Dorothea Dix, on March 8, 1882 the Mississippi State Legislature passed legislation establishing the East Mississippi State Insane Asylum. In 1898 the facility's name was changed to the East Mississippi Insane Hospital. In the 1930s the facility received its current name. In 1984 the MDMH Board of Mental Health established a catchment area to EMSH so that admissions to EMSH and the Mississippi State Hospital would be balanced. As of 2010 the 31 county catchment area for EMSH has a population of about 900,000 people.

References

Hospital buildings completed in 1885
Buildings and structures in Meridian, Mississippi
Psychiatric hospitals in Mississippi
Hospitals established in 1882